Enclosed C or circled Latin C (Ⓒ or ⓒ) is a typographical symbol.  As one of many enclosed alphanumerics, the symbol is a "C" within a circle.

Encodings

Uses
Some Chiyoda Kogaku (aka Chiyoko) cameras of the 1947 to 1949 era featured a blue ⓒ symbol as part of the lens designation like in "ⓒ Super Rokkor", e.g. on the Minolta 35 or the Minolta Memo. It was used to indicate a (single) coated optics rather than any copyright. Similar engravings can be found also on lenses of other manufacturers, e.g. some Olympus Zuiko lenses carry a red-colored "Zuiko C." designation indicating coated optics.

This symbol was widely used by the Cruver manufacturing company on their plastic recognition models that were produced during World War II.

See also
 Copyright symbol
 Copyleft symbol

References

Typographical symbols